Street Smart may refer to:

 Street Smart (video game), a 1989 arcade game by SNK
 Street Smart (film), a 1987 film with Christopher Reeve and Morgan Freeman
 Street Smart (TV series), a 2018 Australian television series
 Street Smart: Competition, Entrepreneurship, and the Future of Roads, a book about private highways

See also 
 Street Smarts, an American game show
 Streetsmartz, a 2005 Australian television series
 Streetwise (disambiguation)
 Common sense or "street smarts", a basic understanding of the mechanisms of the world